Pals of the Saddle is a 1938 "Three Mesquiteers" Western film starring John Wayne and directed by George Sherman. This is the first of eight films in which Wayne played the lead in the popular series of fifty-one Three Mesquiteers films.

Plot summary

Cast
 John Wayne as Stony Brooke
 Ray Corrigan as Tucson Smith
 Max Terhune as Lullaby Joslin
 Elmer as Elmer (Lullaby's Dummy) (uncredited)  
 Doreen McKay as Ann aka Mirandy, Secret Service Agent
 Joseph Forte as Judge Hastings 
 George Douglas as Paul Hartman (Foreign Agent)
 Frank Milan as Frank, Secret Service Agent
 Ted Adams as Henry C. Gordon (Smuggler)
 Harry Depp as Hotel desk clerk
 Dave Weber as Russian musician
 Don Orlando as Italian musician
 Charles Knight as English musician
 Jack Kirk as Sheriff Johnson
 Yakima Canutt as Henchman (uncredited)  
 Otto Hoffman as Townsman (uncredited) 
 Monte Montague as Henchman at Acme Salt Refinery (uncredited) 
 George Montgomery as Rider (uncredited)

See also
 John Wayne filmography

References

External links

 
 
 
 

1938 films
1938 Western (genre) films
1930s buddy films
American Western (genre) films
American black-and-white films
1930s English-language films
Films directed by George Sherman
Republic Pictures films
Three Mesquiteers films
1930s American films